Rab-like protein 6 is a protein that in humans is encoded by the RABL6 gene.

Interactions 

RABL6 has been shown to interact with MDFI.

References

External links

Further reading